The Rockabilly Hall of Fame is an organization and website launched on March 21, 1997, to present early rock and roll history and information relating to the artists and personalities involved in rockabilly.

Headquartered in Nashville, Tennessee, the first induction certificate was issued on November 16, 1997, for singer Gene Vincent. The creation of Bob Timmers, the not-for-profit entity maintains a website that is supported in part by the fans and artists of the music it represents. The site has a UK representative (Rod Pyke) and Canadian representative (Johnny Vallis). Over 5,000 "legends" are listed on the web site, and about 400 have been "inducted". Inductions are restricted to artists with notable performances prior to (and including) 1962. The web site features news updates, artist profile pages, performer tribute pages, videos, photos, and feature columns.

Among honorees are pioneer singers, songwriters, disc jockeys, and promoters/producers such as Sun Records owner Sam Phillips.

The foundation became inactive in 2018. Founder Bob Timmers died on March 22, 2022, however, the Rockabilly Hall of Fame Museum™️ has absorbed all of Timmers works and are continuing on to give this roots music genre it’s rightful place in American music history!

See also
 List of music museums

References

Rockabilly
Music halls of fame
Halls of fame in Tennessee
Culture of Nashville, Tennessee
Organizations established in 1997
1997 establishments in Tennessee